The Young Mao Zedong statue  is located on Orange Isle in Changsha, Hunan. The Hunan People's Government began building it in 2007 and it was completed two years later, in 2009. It took more than 800 tons of granite mined from Fujian to complete.

It is 83 metres long, symbolising Mao's age at his death, 41m wide, symbolising the number of years he led the Chinese Communist Party from the Zunyi Conference to his death, and 32m high, representing Mao's age when he wrote his poem dedicated to Changsha city.

See also 
 Adiyogi Shiva statue
 Atatürk Mask, İzmir
 Emperors Yan and Huang
 Mount Rushmore

Gallery

References

External links
 

Buildings and structures in Changsha
Colossal statues in China
Granite sculptures in China
Statues of Mao Zedong
Monuments and memorials in China
Outdoor sculptures in China
Tourism in China
Tourist attractions in Changsha
2009 establishments in China